Bhumjaithai Party (BJT; , , ; 'Thai Pride Party') was founded on 5 November 2008, in anticipation of the 2 December 2008 Constitutional Court of Thailand ruling that dissolved its "de facto predecessor", the Neutral Democratic Party, along with the People's Power Party (PPP), and the Thai Nation Party. After the dissolutions, former members of the Neutral Democratic Party and former members of the PPP faction, the Friends of Newin Group defected to this party.

History 
On 15 December 2008, the party endorsed the Democrat Party, forming a six-party coalition government under Prime Minister Abhisit Vejjajiva. The party's "de facto" leader and power broker behind joining the Democrat-led coalition is Newin Chidchob. Due to his role as an executive of the PPP predecessor party, the Thai Rak Thai party which was dissolved in 2007, he became ineligible to be a party member for five years. It is alleged that army commander and co-leader of the 2006 coup, General Anupong Paochinda, coerced the MPs of the Friends of Newin Group faction in the PPP to endorse a Democrat Party-led coalition. This secured enough parliamentary votes to allow Abhisit to be elected prime minister. Bhumjaithai was the second largest coalition partner in the Abhisit government, supplying the ministers of Transport, Commerce, and Interior (Chaovarat Chanweerakul), and four deputy ministers.

For the general election on 3 July 2011, Bhumjaithai forged an alliance with coalition partner Chartthaipattana Party. The party aimed at winning as many as 111 seats in the new parliament. During the campaign, a main BJT canvasser, Suban Chiraphanwanit, was shot dead. Eventually, BJT won 34 of the 500 seats in the House of Representatives, which observers have interpreted as disappointing. Subsequently, the party's Matchima-faction, led by Somsak Thepsuthin, tried to join the Pheu-Thai-led coalition government of Prime Minister-designate Yingluck Shinawatra, despite the party's ruling out cooperation with Pheu Thai before the elections. The Pheu Thai Party rejected the participation of BJT members.

On 14 September 2012, Anuthin Charnvirakul was elected the new leader of the Bhumjaithai Party during the party's general assembly to elect a new 11-member executive committee. He replaced his father Chaovarat Chanweerakul, who had resigned. Also elected were Saksayam Chidchob as the new secretary-general, Nathee Ratchakijprakarn as treasurer, Sora-ath Klinprathum as an executive committee member and party advisory chairman, and Supamas Issarapakdi as party spokeswoman.

Bhumjaithai has a populist platform, since some of the platform was drawn from Thaksin's populist Thai Rak Thai party, and the People's Power Party. The party has a strong base in Buriram Province.

See also 
 Neutral Democratic Party
 Friends of Newin Group
 List of political parties in Thailand

References

Political parties established in 2008
Political parties in Thailand
Centrist parties in Thailand
2008 establishments in Thailand